Kasson is an unincorporated community in Barbour County, West Virginia, United States.

The community derives its name from one Mr. Cassen, an early postmaster.

References

Unincorporated communities in Barbour County, West Virginia
Unincorporated communities in West Virginia